Hurricanes Poua are a New Zealand women's professional rugby union team based in Wellington, New Zealand that competes in the Super Rugby Aupiki competition.

History

Team name 
On 7 February 2022, The Hurricanes revealed the new name of their women’s team – Hurricanes Poua. The new team identity was developed collaboratively by a select committee that included past and present Black Ferns. They drew from preexisting Māori narratives, the team’s identity has a connection to both the Hurricanes region and their people. The name Poua was derived from the Māori narrative of Ranginui (sky father) and Papatūānuku (earthmother).

Super Rugby Aupiki announced 
New Zealand Rugby announced that an elite women’s competition, consisting of four teams, called Super Rugby Aupiki was confirmed for March 2022. The competition would run for four weeks and the women would be paid for their participation.

Inaugural squad and coaching team named 
Hurricanes Poua released a list of players that had signed for the inaugural Super Rugby Aupiki season. Wesley Clarke was appointed as Head Coach of Hurricanes Poua. Former Black Fern, Victoria Grant, and Manawatu Cyclones Head Coach, Fusi Feaunati, were named as his assistant coaches. Sarah Hirini was named to captain the side for their maiden season.

Inaugural season 
The Hurricanes Poua were forced to withdraw from their opening match against the Blues Women due to COVID cases and isolation requirements within the team. The teams shared the competition points as the match had been cancelled. After missing out on their opening game, Hurricanes Poua finally got their much awaited debut. They faced Chiefs Manawa in the second round of competition but were beaten 29–8. Hurricanes Poua recorded their first win in the final round after defeating Matatū 18–6.

2023 
Victoria Grant was appointed as the new Head Coach of Hurricanes Poua for the 2023 Sky Super Rugby Aupiki season.

Current squad 
2023 Super Rugby Aupiki squad.

Coaches and management 

 Head Coach: Victoria Grant
 Assistant Coach: –
 Skills Coach: Fusi Feaunati

 Resource Coach: Matt Sexton
 Team Manager: Mary-Jane Durkin
 Doctor: Dr. Lincoln Wharetohunga
 Physiotherapist: Kara Fowke
 Performance Analyst: Matt Healey
 Strength & Conditioning Coach: Luke Vasu

Captain

Coach 

Notes: Official Super Rugby Aupiki competition matches only, including finals.

References

External links 
 Official website

2021 establishments in New Zealand
Super Rugby Aupiki
New Zealand rugby union teams
Rugby clubs established in 2021
Sport in Wellington